Falling Spring Presbyterian Church Manse, also known as The Old Manse, is a historic Presbyterian manse located at 650 Falling Spring Road in Glasgow, Rockbridge County, Virginia. It was built in 1857, and is a 1 1/2-story, five bay, "L"-shaped, Gothic Revival style brick dwelling. It has a side gable roof and a central-passage, double-pile plan.

It was listed on the National Register of Historic Places in 2005.

References

Clergy houses in the United States
Gothic Revival architecture in Virginia
Houses completed in 1857
Houses in Rockbridge County, Virginia
National Register of Historic Places in Rockbridge County, Virginia
1857 establishments in Virginia